Yell is an unincorporated community in Marshall County, in the U.S. state of Tennessee.

History
A post office called Yell was established in 1882, and remained in operation until 1904. The community has the name of Archibald Yell, who fell at the Battle of Buena Vista.

References

Unincorporated communities in Marshall County, Tennessee
Unincorporated communities in Tennessee